Florin Cezar Crăciun (born 27 June 1989) is a Romanian bobsledder who has competed since 2008. At the 2010 Winter Olympics in Vancouver, he finished 11th in the two-man event and 15th in the four-man event.

At the FIBT World Championships, Crăciun earned his best finish of 8th in the two-man event at Königssee in 2011.

References

External links
 
 
 
 

1989 births
Bobsledders at the 2010 Winter Olympics
Bobsledders at the 2014 Winter Olympics
Bobsledders at the 2018 Winter Olympics
Living people
Olympic bobsledders of Romania
Romanian male bobsledders